Lem Ferreira is a subdivision of the city of Praia in the island of Santiago, Cape Verde. Its population was 1,456 at the 2010 census. It is situated directly east of the city centre (Platô), on the east bank of Ribeira da Trindade. Bordering neighborhoods include Agua Funda to the northeast, Achada Grande Frente to the east and the south and Platô and Praia Negra to the west.

References

Subdivisions of Praia